A swordstick or cane-sword is a cane containing a hidden blade. The term is typically used to describe European weapons from around the 18th century, but similar devices have been used throughout history, notably the Roman dolon, the Japanese shikomizue and the Indian gupti.

Popularity
The swordstick was a popular fashion accessory for the wealthy during the 18th and 19th centuries. During this period, it was becoming less socially acceptable to openly carry a sword, but there were still upper-class men routinely trained in swordsmanship who wished to go armed for self-defense.  Swords concealed in ladies' walking sticks and parasols were also not unknown, as it was even less socially acceptable for a lady to carry a sword, or publicly admit that she knew how to use one.

Soon after their introduction, other "gadget canes" became popular. Instead of a blade, these would hold the tools of one's trade, compasses, and even flasks for keeping alcohol. There were special swordsticks that had guns installed in the hilt. But the use was unlikely.

Construction
Malacca wood was the most commonly used material in making the cane shafts, and the standard grip was rounded and metallic. Today, designer and collector canes have sterling silver handles, and are made with wooden shafts made from various woods, including Malacca and bamboo. Ornate designs, such as animal heads, skulls, and various emblems may also be carved into the wooden handles; these may make them harder to wield, but some find them more attractive. Sword canes are most often made with rapier-pointed blades.

Legality
In many jurisdictions the ownership, carrying, manufacturing or trading in sword canes is restricted by law.

Belgium
Possession of a swordstick is prohibited in Belgium as it falls under concealed weapons.

France
Having a swordstick is considered as having weapons of the 6th category. It is legal to own, however, specific care must be taken in case of transportation. (French defence code; Article L2331-1)

Germany 
Handling of swordsticks (including those with short blades) is forbidden as concealed weapons.

New Zealand
Swordsticks are considered a prohibited offensive weapon in New Zealand.

Republic of Ireland
In the Republic of Ireland, the Firearms and Offensive Weapons Act, 1990 forbids the manufacture, importation, sale, hire or loan of swordsticks.

United Kingdom
The Criminal Justice Act 1988 (Offensive Weapons) Order 1988,  also made it illegal to trade in sword canes in the United Kingdom. However, antique swordsticks which are 100 years old or older are exempt.
It’s illegal to:
sell a knife to anyone under 18, unless it has a folding blade 3 inches long (7.62 cm) or less
carry a knife in public without good reason, unless it has a folding blade with a cutting edge 3 inches long or less
carry, buy or sell any type of banned knife (of which sword sticks are one)
use any knife in a threatening way (even a legal knife)

United States
A swordstick may be illegal to carry in many jurisdictions as it is a concealed weapon, and is sometimes considered a disguised weapon. U.S. states with statutes that expressly prohibit the carrying of swordsticks include Arkansas (Ark. Code Ann. § 5-73-120(b)(3)(B)) and California (Cal Pen Code § 12020(a)(1). 

Other states may include swordsticks under the general ban on carrying a concealed weapon or a weapon disguised so as to conceal its true nature; an example of such a case can be found in State v. McCoy, 618 N.W.2d 324 (Iowa 2000).

See also
 Cane gun
 Pata (sword)

References

External links 
 

Modern European swords
Walking sticks